Norway competed at the 2009 World Championships in Athletics from 15–23 August. A team of 14 athletes was announced in preparation for the competition. Selected athletes have achieved one of the competition's qualifying standards. Javelin thrower Andreas Thorkildsen is the defending olympic and European champion, and has won silver in the last two World Championships in Athletics.

Team selection 

Track and road events

Field and combined events

References
 berlin.iaaf.org: Norway - Athletes participating per day

External links
Official competition website

Nations at the 2009 World Championships in Athletics
World Championships in Athletics
Norway at the World Championships in Athletics